The 1929 All-Eastern football team consists of American football players chosen by various selectors as the best players at each position among the Eastern colleges and universities during the 1929 college football season.

All-Eastern selections

Quarterbacks
 Albie Booth, Yale (AP-1, UP-1 [hb], NEA-1)

Halfbacks
 Toby Uausa, Pittsburgh (AP-1, UP-1, NEA-1)
 Chris Cagle, Army (AP-1, NEA-1)

Fullbacks
 Alton Marsters, Dartmouth (AP-1, UP-1 [qb], NEA-1)
 Clarke Hinkle, Bucknell (UP-1)

Ends
 Joe Donchess, Pittsburgh (AP-1, UP-1, NEA-1)
 Douglas, Harvard (AP-1)
 Bates, Western Maryland (UP-1)
 Jerry Nemecek, NYU (NEA-1)

Tackles
 Sam Wakeman, Cornell (AP-1, UP-1, NEA-1)
 Francis T. Vincent, Yale (AP-1)
 Forrest Douds, Washington & Jefferson (UP-1)
 Ellsworth Armstrong (NEA-1)

Guards
 Ray Montgomery, Pittsburgh (AP-1, UP-1, NEA-1)
 Waldo W. Greene, Yale (AP-1, UP-1)

Centers
 Ben Ticknor, Harvard (AP-1, UP-1, NEA-1 [g])
 Tony Siano, Fordham (NEA-1)

Key
 AP = Associated Press
 UP = United Press
 NEA = Newspaper Enterprise Association

See also
 1929 College Football All-America Team

References

All-Eastern
All-Eastern college football teams